The following low-power television stations broadcast on digital or analog channel 25 in the United States:

 K25AD-D in Victorville, etc., California
 K25BP-D in Billings, Montana
 K25CG-D in Aberdeen, Washington
 K25CK-D in Montpelier, Idaho
 K25CP-D in Tulia, Texas
 K25CQ-D in Childress, Texas
 K25CV-D in Hays, Kansas
 K25DH-D in Meadview, Arizona
 K25DI in Silver City, New Mexico
 K25EN-D in Gold Beach, Oregon
 K25FI-D in Mora, New Mexico
 K25FP-D in Ellensburg, Washington
 K25FR-D in Elko, Nevada
 K25FZ-D in Grand Junction, Colorado
 K25GA-D in Redmond/Prineville, Oregon
 K25GE-D in Durango, Colorado
 K25GK-D in Joshua Tree, California
 K25GM-D in Newport, Nebraska
 K25GS-D in Manti and Ephraim, Utah
 K25GY-D in Beryl/Modena/New Castle, Utah
 K25GZ-D in Holyoke, Colorado
 K25HG-D in Preston, Idaho
 K25HJ-D in Hornsby Ranch, etc., New Mexico
 K25HO-D in Wolf Point, Montana
 K25HV-D in Truth or Consequences, New Mexico
 K25II-D in Redwood Falls, Minnesota
 K25IM-D in Medford, Oregon
 K25IP-D in Malad City, Idaho
 K25IW-D in Golconda, Nevada
 K25IX-D in Huntsville, etc., Utah
 K25JJ-D in Fillmore/Meadow, etc., Utah
 K25JO-D in Altus, Oklahoma
 K25JQ-D in May, etc., Oklahoma
 K25JT-D in Blanding/Monticello, Utah
 K25JW-D in Hugo, etc., Oregon
 K25KR-D in Round Mountain, Nevada
 K25KS-D in The Dalles, Oregon
 K25KV-D in Huntington, Utah
 K25KY-D in Fresno, California
 K25KZ-D in Kalispell, Montana
 K25LA-D in Fort Morgan, Colorado
 K25LE-D in Las Animas, Colorado
 K25LF-D in Philipsburg, Montana
 K25LG-D in Tyler, Texas
 K25LH-D in Fishlake Resort, Utah
 K25LI-D in Wright, Wyoming
 K25LJ-D in Tres Piedras, New Mexico
 K25LM-D in Great Falls, Montana
 K25LO-D in Hamilton, Montana
 K25LU-D in Mesquite, Nevada
 K25LY-D in Fargo, North Dakota
 K25MG-D in Flagstaff, Arizona
 K25MK-D in Camp Verde, Arizona
 K25MP-D in Bonners Ferry, Idaho
 K25MR-D in Snowmass Village, Colorado
 K25MW-D in Baudette, Minnesota
 K25MZ-D in Conrad, Montana
 K25NG-D in St. Louis, Missouri
 K25NI-D in Mapleton, Oregon
 K25NJ-D in Sweetgrass, etc., Montana
 K25NK-D in Rochester, Minnesota
 K25NN-D in Nephi, Utah
 K25NO-D in Gasquet, California
 K25NY-D in Bridgeport, Washington
 K25NZ-D in Lewiston, Idaho
 K25OA-D in Dillon, Montana
 K25OB-D in San Antonio, Texas
 K25OG-D in Falls City, Nebraska
 K25OI-D in Soda Springs, Idaho
 K25OJ-D in La Grande, Oregon
 K25OK-D in Yoncalla, Oregon
 K25OM-D in Prescott, Arizona
 K25OO-D in Pendleton, Oregon
 K25OP-D in Kellogg, Idaho
 K25OR-D in McCall, Idaho
 K25OS-D in Thompson Falls, Montana
 K25OU-D in Brookings, South Dakota
 K25OW-D in Marysvale, Utah
 K25OX-D in Hagerman, Idaho
 K25OY-D in Summit County, Utah
 K25OZ-D in East Price, Utah
 K25PA-D in St. George, Utah
 K25PC-D in Gateway, Colorado
 K25PD-D in Parowan/Enoch/Paragonah, Utah
 K25PE-D in Decorah, Iowa
 K25PF-D in Delta, Oak City, etc., Utah
 K25PG-D in Strong City, Oklahoma
 K25PH-D in Roosevelt, Utah
 K25PI-D in Kasilof, Alaska
 K25PJ-D in Chloride, Arizona
 K25PL-D in Ridgecrest, California
 K25PM-D in Helper, Utah
 K25PO-D in Holbrook, Idaho
 K25PP-D in Eureka, Nevada
 K25PQ-D in Fallon, Nevada
 K25PT-D in Sargents, Colorado
 K25PU-D in Mina/Luning, Nevada
 K25PV-D in Yakima, Washington
 K25PX-D in Lund & Preston, Nevada
 K25PY-D in Leadore, Idaho
 K25PZ-D in Alexandria, Louisiana
 K25QA-D in Odessa, Texas
 K25QB-D in Lucerne Valley, California
 K25QD-D in Tohatchi, New Mexico
 K25QI-D in Woody Creek, Colorado
 K25QK-D in Anchorage, Alaska
 K25QL-D in Chico, California
 K25QS-D in Cortez, Colorado
 K25QT-D in Columbia, Missouri
 K28GQ-D in Rural Iron, etc., Utah
 K38IU-D in Susanville, etc., California
 K50MY-D in Cody, Wyoming
 KAUN-LD in Sioux Falls, South Dakota
 KCKW-LD in Eugene, Oregon
 KCTL-LD in Livingston, Texas, to move to channel 29
 KDAS-LD in Santa Rosa, California
 KDVD-LD in Globe, Arizona
 KEZI in Oakridge, Oregon
 KFDF-CD in Fort Smith, Arkansas
 KFKY-LD in Springfield, Missouri
 KFLL-LD in Boise, Idaho
 KGCT-CD in Nowata, Oklahoma
 KHAX-LP in Vista, California
 KHPZ-CD in Round Rock, Texas
 KJNK-LD in Minneapolis, Minnesota
 KJPO-LD in Tonopah, Arizona
 KKRA-LD in Rapid City, South Dakota
 KLFA-LD in Santa Maria, California
 KMYA-LD in Sheridan, Arkansas
 KNPL-LD in North Platte, Nebraska
 KOPS-LD in Beaumont, Texas
 KPVM-LD in Las Vegas / Pahrump, Nevada
 KQDF-LD in Santa Fe, New Mexico
 KRHT-LD in Redding, California
 KRRI-LD in Reno, Nevada
 KSVN-CD in Ogden, Utah
 KVCT in Victoria, Texas
 KXCO-LD in Refugio, Texas
 W25AA-D in Onancock, Virginia
 W25AT-D in Tupper Lake, New York
 W25BT-D in Monkton, Vermont
 W25DQ-D in Key West, Florida
 W25ED-D in Albany, Georgia
 W25EM-D in Columbus, Georgia
 W25ER-D in Vero Beach, Florida
 W25FC-D in Jasper, Alabama
 W25FG-D in Philadelphia, Pennsylvania
 W25FH-D in Fort Wayne, Indiana
 W25FI-D in Maplewood, Ohio
 W25FP-D in Young Harris, Georgia
 W25FR-D in Clarksburg, West Virginia
 W25FS-D in Clarksburg, West Virginia
 W25FW-D in Columbus, Georgia
 W25FX-D in Sutton, West Virginia
 WBNM-LD in Louisville, Kentucky
 WCPX-LD in Columbus, Ohio
 WCQT-LD in Cullman, Alabama
 WCWW-LD in South Bend, Indiana
 WEDK-LD in Effingham, Illinois
 WFEF-LD in Orlando, Florida
 WJGP-LD in Kalamazoo, Michigan
 WJGV-CD in Palatka, Florida
 WJXE-LD in Gainesville, Florida
 WKNI-LP in Andalusia, Alabama
 WLMS-LD in Columbus, Mississippi
 WMEB-TV in East Eddington, Maine
 WNYP-LD in Port Jervis, New York
 WOGC-CD in Holland, Michigan
 WQIX-LD in Vidalia, Georgia
 WTVU-CD in Syracuse, New York
 WTXF-TV (DRT) in Allentown, Pennsylvania
 WUEK-LD in Canton, Ohio
 WVAD-LD in Chesapeake, Virginia
 WWBK-LD in Richmond, Virginia
 WXCB-CD in Delaware, Ohio
 WYAT-LD in Martinsville, Virginia
 WYHB-CD in Chattanooga, Tennessee
 WYOU in Waymart, Pennsylvania

The following low-power stations, which are no longer licensed, formerly broadcast on analog channel 25:
 K25AL in Lake Havasu City, Arizona
 K25CI in Klamath, California
 K25EB in Crowley Lake-Long Va, California
 K25EE in Mountain View, etc., Utah
 K25GJ in Muskogee, Oklahoma
 K25HD-D in Bullhead City, Arizona
 K25HI in Santa Rosa, California
 K25IC in Lawton, Oklahoma
 K25JZ in Walker, Minnesota
 K25LT-D in Cortez, Colorado
 K25ND-D in Mount Vernon, Texas
 KBLM-LP in Riverside and Perris, California
 KHDE-LP in Laramie, Wyoming
 KLDT-LD in Lufkin, Texas
 KPDC-LP in Indio, California
 KSKP-CA in Oxnard, California
 KWJD-LP in Van Nuys, California
 KXLH-LP in Helena, Montana
 W25DX in Escanaba, Michigan
 W25EG-D in Columbus, Georgia
 WBQC-LP in Cincinnati, Ohio
 WMKB-LP in Rochelle, Illinois
 WQEP-LD in Augusta, Georgia
 WSSS-LP in Steubenville, Ohio
 WSVF-LP in Staunton-Waynesboro, Virginia

References

25 low-power